Joshua Leroy Franklin Siafa (born 7 October 1994) is an English professional footballer who plays as a defender.

Playing career

Millwall
Siafa was attached to the Arsenal Academy until he switched to the West Ham United Academy in August 2008. He was released by the "Hammers" in 2013 and signed with Millwall.

Having been regular in Neil Harris' U21 Development Squad throughout the course of the 2013/14 season, Saifa signed his first professional contract with the club ahead of the 2014–15 season. Siafa made his professional debut, in the first round of Football League Cup, coming on as a substitute for Jermaine Easter in the 84h minutes, in a 1–0 against Wycombe Wanderers. However, after two years at Millwall, Siafa was among eighteen players to be released by the club when their contract expired.
He joined Scottish Premiership club Kilmarnock as a trialist in July 2015, and is part of their pre season training squad.

Career statistics

References

External links

1994 births
Living people
English footballers
Association football defenders
Millwall F.C. players
English Football League players
English sportspeople of Sierra Leonean descent
Black British sportspeople